The Los Angeles Aftershock were a team in the American Basketball Association. The team took over for the Los Angeles Stars, whose only season was in 2004–2005. The Aftershock folded after the 2005–2006 season.

2004–2005 season

Los Angeles Stars folded after their owner's rent checks bounced.

2005-2006 season
The Aftershock had an 11-15 regular season record and made it to the playoffs, but lost in the second round to the San Jose Skyrockets.

Summer Pro League 2005
They scheduled six games in the Southern California Summer Pro League ("SPL") which has been around for 35 years and is composed NBA teams and current NBA stars as well as other local talent and international teams.
July 10, 100-98 win over PSL Panthers 
July 12, 100-102 loss to Unity
July 16, 106-94 win over the NBA Pros
July 16, 89-125  loss to Play 2 Win
July 17, 95-105 loss to Pro Sports Now
July 19, 92-98  loss to  P. Miller

SPL 2005 Record
2-4  .333

Roster
3 Charles Litt Guard 6' 0"  Benedictine University 
4 Jason Braxton Guard 6' 2" Arizona State University 
5 Chioke Conner Forward 6' 5" Shelby State 
6 Jamar Cramer Guard 6' 3" L.A. Trade 
8 Thomas Blunt Center 6' 7" Concordia of St. Paul 
10 Will Burr Guard 6' 3" Clark College Atlanta 
13 Rambo Rasheed Guard 6' 0" South Dakota State 
20 Terrence Martin Guard 6'4 Arkansas Tech
21 Dion Bailey Guard 6' 4" Utah State 
22 Ron Strange Forward 6' 8" Cal Poly Pomona 
23 Chad Brown Guard 6' 4" Wyoming/Cal State Hayward 
24 Justin Wrubel Guard 6' 2" St. Mary's High School
32 Derek Jones Forward 6' 6" UC Santa Cruz 
33 Matthew Houser Forward 6' 8" Chico State 
34 Tyler Murphy Guard/Forward 6' 7" USC 
44 Corey Williams Forward 6' 7" Paine State
55 Jeff Dailey Center 7'1" Southern Utah

Schedule
November 5 vs. O.C. Buzz Lost [107-110] 
November 11 vs. SoCal Legends Won [128-114] 
November 12 vs. O.C. Buzz Lost [109-111] 
November 13 vs. Tijuana Dragons Won [141-102]
November 18 vs. Bellingham Slam Won [119-114] 
November 19 vs. Bellingham Slam Won [117-113 
December 2 @ San Francisco Pilots Lost [89-92] 
December 3 @ Las Vegas Rattlers Won [122-119] 
December 8 @ Tijuana Dragons Won [127-103] 
December 11 vs. San Jose Skyrockets Lost [118-121] 
December 13 @ SoCal Legends  Lost [94-107] 
January 5 @ Beijing Olympians Lost [76-85] 
January 10 @ Gallup Talons Lost [112-115] 
January 11 @ Gallup Talons Lost [104-112] 
January 14 @ Beijing Olympians Won [87-80] 
January 19 @ Tijuana Dragons Lost [90-104] 
January 21 @ Fresno Heatwave Lost [107-110] 
January 22 @ Fresno Heatwave Won [103-101] 
January 25 @ SoCal Legends Lost [104-119] 
January 28 vs. O.C. Buzz Won [125-107] 
January 29 @ O.C. Buzz Lost [90-115] 
February 4 @ O.C. Buzz Won [114-100] 
February 14 @ Bellingham Slam Lost [80-128] 
February 16 @ Bellingham Slam Lost [100-107] 
February 17 @ Bellevue Blackhawks Won [125-91] 
February 25 vs. Gallup Talons Cancelled 7:30 p.m. 
February 26 vs. Gallup Talons Cancelled 5:30 p.m. 
March 4 vs. Beijing Olympians Lost [-] 
March 12 vs. Beijing Olympians 1st Round Playoffs Won [91-86] 
March 18 @ San Jose Skyrockets 2nd Round Playoffs Lost [132-90]

References

External links
Los Angeles Aftershock Official Website
Los Angeles Stars Official WebSite

Continental Basketball Association teams
Aftershock
Defunct American Basketball Association (2000–present) teams
Basketball teams established in 2003
2003 establishments in California